"That's All" is a 1952 song written by Alan Brandt with music by Bob Haymes. It has been covered by many jazz and blues artists. The first recording, by Nat King Cole in 1953, achieved some popularity but was not among that year's top 20 songs. It was Bobby Darin's version in his 1959 album That's All that introduced the song to a wider audience.

The song is part of the Great American Songbook, and Alec Wilder included it in his book American Popular Song: The Great Innovators, 1900–1950, even though it was composed two years after that period. Wilder gave two reasons for making this exception: (1) “it is one of the last free-flowing, native, and natural melodies in the grand pop style”; (2) “it went through no initial hit phase but became an immediate standard”.

Cover versions
Edie Adams on the final episode of The Lucy–Desi Comedy Hour (1960)
Michael Bublé on Michael Bublé (2003)
Ceil Clayton on Ceil Clayton, Norman Records (1964)
Darren Criss at Northalsted Market Days (2011)
June Christy - The Misty Miss Christy (1956), A Lovely Way to Spend An Evening (1986)
Nat King Cole on This Is Nat 'King' Cole, LP T-870, (1957)Billy Eckstine with Pete Rugoloand his Orchestra (1958) 
Sam Cooke
Dorothy Dandridge
Tony Danza on The House I Live In (2002)
Bobby Darin on That's All (1959)
Eliane Elias on her album Dreamer (2004)
Bill Elliott & Wendi Williams on the soundtrack for Introducing Dorothy Dandridge (1999)
Connie Francis on The Exciting Connie Francis (1959)
Judy Garland on The Judy Garland Show (1964)
Leif Garrett on Leif Garrett (1977)
Johnny Hartman on This One's for Tedi (1985)
Dick Haymes (elder brother of the song's composer) on Keep It Simple (1978)
Harry James on In A Relaxed Mood (MGM E-4274, 1965)
Joni James on Like Three O'Clock In The Morning (1963)
Beverly Kenney on Snuggled on your Shoulder (1954)
Stacey Kent on Tenderly (2015)
Barney Kessel on Easy Like (1956)
Johnny Mathis on Heavenly (1959)
Johnny Nash on Johnny Nash (1958)
Ricky Nelson on Songs by Ricky (1959); single reached #48 on Billboard in 1963
Carl Riseley on The Rise (2008)
Mathilde Santing on Ballads (2004)
Nina Simone on Nina Simone With StringsFrank Sinatra on Sinatra and Strings (1962)
Rod Stewart on It Had to Be You: the Great American SongbookCurtis Stigers on Hooray for Love (2014)
Billy Taylor Trio, Prestige Records (1953)
Thee Midniters
Mel Torme on That's All (1965)
Steve Tyrell on This Guy's In Love (2003)
Sarah Vaughan on Sarah Vaughan a Paris (1958)
Frederica von Stade on Flicka: Another Side of Frederica von Stade (1990)
Ben Webster on King of the Tenors (1953)
Father Tom Vaughn on Cornbread (Meat Loaf, Greens & Devilled Eggs) (1967)
Ahmad Jamal on Ahmad Jamal Trio Volume IV (1958)
Will Downing with Stevie Wonder on Love's the Place to Be (1993)
Lee Morgan on "Introducing Lee Morgan" (1956)

In popular culture
Adam Sandler (in The Wedding Singer)
Ace Young (on American Idol)
Edie Adams (on the final episode of The Lucy-Desi Comedy Hour)
Gail Edwards (on It's a Living episode "Healings, Nothing More Than Healings)
Kevin Spacey (as Bobby Darin in Beyond the Sea performing at the Copacabana.)
Dustin Hoffman (in Tootsie'')

References

1952 songs
American songs
Pop standards
Frank Sinatra songs
Nancy Wilson (jazz singer) songs
Nina Simone songs
Johnny Mathis songs
Leif Garrett songs
1950s jazz standards
Songs written by Bob Haymes